Russi is a commune in the Province of Ravenna in the Italian region, Emilia-Romagna.

Russi may also refer to:
 U.S. Russi, an Italian association football club located in Russi
 Bernhard Russi (born 1948), former World Cup alpine ski racer from Switzerland
 Franco dei Russi (fl. 15th century) Italian painter, active in field of manuscript illumination
Russi Karanjia (1912–2008), Indian journalist, editor, and founder of the tabloids, the Blitz and the Daily
Russi Mody (1918–2014), Indian businessman
Russi Taylor (1944–2019), American voice actress

See also 
 Rossi (disambiguation)
 Russia (disambiguation)
 Russo (disambiguation)

Disambiguation pages with given-name-holder lists
English unisex given names
English feminine given names